Abul Harris Chowdhury (born 1 November 1952) is a Bangladeshi politician who served as the Political Secretary of Prime Minister  Begum Khaleda Zia. He was the Joint Secretary General of Bangladesh Nationalist Party. Chowdhury was sentenced to 65 years in total and a life term in prison in absentia for allegedly committing multiple crimes  that his party says he was falsely charged with along with the party leader Begum Khaleda Zia’s son Tarique Rahman and many other senior party members.

Career
In 1991, Chowdhury lost the Bangladeshi general election as a BNP candidate from the Sylhet-5 constituency. Before 2001, he was the president of National Institute for Deaf and Dumb when he hired eight to nine shops of the institution and launched car business through Asha Car Vision. He served as the political secretary of the then Prime Minister Khaleda Zia from 2001 to 2006.

Charges and convictions
Chowdhury has been a fugitive since the military-backed interim caretaker government took power on 11 January 2007. Later that year, Chowdhury was charged by the caretaker government of acquiring his wealth through corruption. In October, he was sentenced to three years in jail by a special anti-corruption tribunal for illegally possessing foreign currency. In November, a Dhaka court sentenced him to 59 years in jail and fined him Tk 21 lakh on five counts of charges, including abuse of power and government-transport mishandling.

He was charged with involvement in the murder of former finance minister, Shah A M S Kibria, in 2005. In November 2014, a supplementary charge-sheet was submitted accusing 35 people including Chowdhury. Chowdhury was also charged with Zia Charitable Trust corruption case.

Chowdhury was charged with involvement in the 15 August 2004 Dhaka grenade attack. In December 2014, an arrest warrant was issued against him. In February 2016, his properties were confiscated by the directives of Bangladesh High Court. In October 2018, a special court found Chowdhury and 37 others guilty in the grenade attack case. He was sentenced to life term in prison and fined Tk 50,000. Interpol Red Notice had been served on him in November 2015. According to CID and police headquarters sources, as of October 2018, Chowdhury was moving through Malaysia, London, Singapore, the United States and India.

Personal life and death
Chowdhury is married to Josne Ara Chowdhury. They have a son, Nayem Shafi Chowdhury, and a daughter, Samira Tanjin. He has a younger brother, Selim Chowdhury, and an elder sister, Akhlasun Nahar.

On 12 January 2022, Chowdhury's cousin announced in a Facebook post that Chowdhury had died from COVID-19 complications in London, United Kingdom, in September 2021, and was buried at the same location . While his cousin's announcement was widely reported, other sources subsequently reported that Chowdhury had not died.

References

1947 births
Living people
Bangladesh Nationalist Party politicians
Bangladeshi politicians convicted of crimes
Place of birth missing (living people)
Date of birth missing (living people)
Bangladeshi male criminals
People from Sylhet District